Lewis Mill is an unincorporated community in Chariton County, in the U.S. state of Missouri.

The community was named after the proprietor of a local grain elevator. The Keokuk and Kansas City Railway served the area in the late 19th century. It was a railroad station stop on service provided by the Baltimore & Ohio Railroad. In 1884 it had a population of over 600 people. Lewis Mill Access is state-operated conservation area near the Little Chariton River.

References

Unincorporated communities in Chariton County, Missouri
Unincorporated communities in Missouri